Herschlag or Hershlag is a German/Yiddish surname. Notable people with the surname include:

Alex Herschlag, American television producer, writer and stand-up comedian
Daniel Herschlag (born 1958), American biochemist
Neta-Lee Hershlag, or her stage name, Natalie Portman, Israeli-American actress 

German-language surnames
Yiddish-language surnames
Jewish surnames